Connor David Syme (born 11 July 1995) is a Scottish professional golfer. He won the 2019 Turkish Airlines Challenge on the Challenge Tour.

Amateur career
Syme won the 2016 Australian Amateur championship. He was also medalist at the 2016 Amateur Championship at Royal Porthcawl and Pyle and Kenfig Golf Club where he shot a bogey-free 68 (−3) in round two to come out on top. He was top points scorer in Scotland's successful defence of the European Team Championship. He also represented Scotland at the Eisenhower Trophy where they led after day one. He helped retain the St Andrews Trophy representing Great Britain and Ireland men's team. He played in the 2017 Walker Cup, at which time he was number 8 on the World Amateur Golf Ranking.

Syme was a member at Drumoig Golf Centre in Fife, Scotland. He is coached by his father, Stuart, who was also a member of the Scotland, Great Britain and Ireland teams.

Professional career
Syme turned professional after playing in the 2017 Walker Cup, signing with Modest Golf Management. He made his pro debut at the Portugal Masters on the European Tour. He finished in a tie for 12th after carding four successive under-par rounds. He had only three bogeys the entire week. Syme finished tied for 9th place in the 2017 European Tour Qualifying School to gain a place on the tour for 2018.

In June 2018, Syme was second in the Shot Clock Masters, his best finish in a European Tour event. This was his only top-10 finish of the 2018 season and he lost his card for 2019. Syme played on the 2019 Challenge Tour. In May he won the Turkish Airlines Challenge, the opening event of the season. In a playoff with Francesco Laporta he won with a birdie 3 at the first extra hole. He finished the season 14th in the Order of Merit to return to the European Tour for 2020.

Amateur wins
2013 Scottish Junior Tour 2
2014 North East District Open Amateur
2016 Australian Amateur
2017 Battle Trophy

Source:

Professional wins (1)

Challenge Tour wins (1)

Challenge Tour playoff record (1–0)

Results in major championships
Results not in chronological order in 2020.

 

CUT = missed the half-way cut
"T" = tied for place
NT = No tournament due to COVID-19 pandemic

Team appearances
Amateur
European Boys' Team Championship (representing Scotland): 2013
Boys Home Internationals (representing Scotland): 2013
Jacques Léglise Trophy (representing Great Britain & Ireland): 2013 (winners)
European Amateur Team Championship (representing Scotland): 2015 (winners), 2016 (winners), 2017
Men's Home Internationals (representing Scotland): 2015
St Andrews Trophy (representing Great Britain & Ireland): 2016 (tie)
Eisenhower Trophy (representing Scotland): 2016
Walker Cup (representing Great Britain & Ireland): 2017

Source:

Professional
European Championships (representing Great Britain): 2018

See also
2017 European Tour Qualifying School graduates
2019 Challenge Tour graduates

References

External links

Scottish male golfers
European Tour golfers
Sportspeople from Kirkcaldy
1995 births
Living people